Stereocaulon myriocarpum is a species of snow lichen belonging to the family Stereocaulaceae.

Ecology
Stereocaulon myriocarpum is a known host to the lichenicolous fungus species:

 Arthonia stereocaulina
 Endococcus nanellus
 Polycoccum trypethelioides

References

Stereocaulaceae
Lichen species
Taxa named by Theodor Magnus Fries
Lichens described in 1857